Sphaerospira is a genus of air-breathing land snails, terrestrial pulmonate gastropod mollusks in the family Camaenidae. 

Some authorities consider this to be merely a subgenus of the genus Thersites.

Species 
Species within the genus Sphaerospira include:
 Sphaerospira arthuriana (Cox, 1873)
 Sphaerospira bencarlessi Stanisic & Potter, 2010
 Sphaerospira blomfieldi (Cox, 1864)
 Sphaerospira fraseri (Gray in Griffith & Pidgeon, 1833)
 Sphaerospira informis (Mousson, 1869)
 Sphaerospira mortenseni (Iredale, 1929)
 Sphaerospira mossmani (Brazier, 1875)
 Sphaerospira oconnellensis (Cox, 1871)
 Sphaerospira rockhamptonensis (Cox, 1873)
 Sphaerospira sidneyi (Iredale, 1933)
 Species brought into synonymy
 Sphaerospira macleayi (Cox, 1865): synonym of Bentosites macleayi (Cox, 1865)
 Sphaerospira parallela Iredale, 1937: synonym of Sphaerospira fraseri (Gray in Griffith & Pidgeon, 1833) (junior synonym)
 Sphaerospira rawnesleyi (Cox, 1873): synonym of Steorra rawnesleyi (Cox, 1873) (superseded combination)
 Sphaerospira whartoni (Cox, 1871): synonym of Temporena whartoni (Cox, 1871)

References

External links
 
 Biologie.uni-ulm info
 Mörch O.A.L. (1867). Abrégé de l'histoire de la classification moderne des mollusques basée principalement sur l'armature linguale. Journal de Conchyliologie. 15: 232-258.
 Pilsbry, H. A. (1890-1891). Manual of conchology, structural and systematic, with illustrations of the species, Second series: Pulmonata. Vol. VI. Helicidae Vol. IV. pp. 1-64, pls 1-15

 
Camaenidae